HMS Ultimatum (P34) was a Royal Navy U-class submarine built by Vickers-Armstrong at Barrow-in-Furness, and part of the third group of that class.  So far she has been the only ship of the Royal Navy to bear the name Ultimatum.

Career
Ultimatum spent her wartime career in the Mediterranean, where she sank the Italian passenger ship Dalmatia L., a German sailing vessel and the Italian submarine .  She was commanded from January 1943 by Lieutenant Hedley Kett. On 30 October 1943, Ultimatum attacked a German U-boat southeast of Toulon, France. This attack was against U-73 but it inflicted no damage. Ultimatum had been credited with sinking U-431 in this attack. However U-431 was sunk with all hands on 21 October 1943 in the Mediterranean off Algiers by depth charges from a British Wellington aircraft. U-431s fate was revised in November 1987 by the Foreign Documents Section of the British Ministry of Defence.

Ultimatum also unsuccessfully attacked the Italian merchant ships Ravello, Luciano Manara and Unione, the Italian submarine Zaffiro and the German auxiliary patrol vessel Uj 6073 / Nimeth Allah.  She had more luck on 2 May 1944, when she shelled the harbour of Kalamata, Greece, sinking two sailing vessels, destroying five on the slips and damaging another.  She also went on to attack a group of small German vessels, successfully hitting and sinking the German barge F 811.

Ultimatum survived the war and was sold to be broken up for scrap on 23 December 1949, and was scrapped at Port Glasgow in February 1950.

Notes

References
 
 
 
 

 

British U-class submarines
Ships built in Barrow-in-Furness
1941 ships
World War II submarines of the United Kingdom